The 2016–17 Iraq FA Cup was the 28th edition of the Iraqi knockout football cup as a clubs-only competition, the main domestic cup in Iraqi football. A total of 19 teams from the Iraqi Premier League and 41 teams from the Iraq Division One participated. It started on 2 December 2016 and the final was played at Al-Sinaa Stadium in Baghdad on 22 August 2017 (the usual venue, Al-Shaab Stadium, was closed for renovation). It was the second Iraq FA Cup final to be held outside Al-Shaab Stadium, with the first being in 2003.

The winners of the competition were Al-Zawraa, who extended their record number of cup wins to 15 with a 1–0 victory over Naft Al-Wasat in the final thanks to a stoppage time goal by Alaa Abdul-Zahra.

Format

Participation 
The cup started with the first round, consisting of the 41 teams from the Iraq Division One, 40 of which played against each other and 1 of which automatically proceeded to the next round. The second round consisted of the 21 qualified teams from the first round, 18 of which played against each other and 3 of which automatically proceeded to the Round of 32. The 20 Iraqi Premier League clubs were to join the 12 qualified teams from the second round to form the Round of 32, but Erbil withdrew from the tournament and therefore Division One side Al-Jinsiya were admitted into the Round of 32 to replace them despite already being knocked out.

The last cup competition saw almost half of the Premier League clubs withdraw from the tournament. To avoid this happening again, the Iraq FA announced that any Premier League team that withdrew would be fined and also deducted three points in the league. However, the Premier League had already finished by the time the Round of 16 came around, so teams who withdrew from that stage onwards faced no sanctions.

Cards 
If a player received a second yellow card, they would be banned from the next cup match. If a player received a red card, they would be banned a minimum of one match, but more could be added by the Iraq Football Association.

No extra-time 
The Iraq Football Association decided that from the Round of 16 onwards, there would not be an extra time period for matches that end in a draw; instead the game would go straight to a penalty shootout.

Participating clubs 
The following 60 teams participated in the competition:

Bold indicates the team is still in the competition.

Schedule 
The rounds of the 2016–17 competition were scheduled as follows:

First round 
40 teams from the Iraq Division One compete in this round, and 1 Division One team (Badr Al-Iraq) is automatically placed into the second round.

Second round 
18 of the 21 qualified teams from the previous round compete in this round, while 4 teams (Al-Siyaha, Al-Kadhimiya, Al-Maslaha and Al-Jinsiya) are automatically placed into the Round of 32. Although Al-Jinsiya were knocked out in the first round, they were chosen to replace Erbil who withdrew from the tournament.

Final phase

Bracket

Round of 32

Round of 16

Quarter-finals

Semi-finals

Final

References

External links
 Iraq Football Association

Iraq FA Cup
Cup
Iraq FA Cup